Jana Vojteková (born 12 August 1991) is a Slovak footballer who plays as a defender for Frauen Bundesliga club SC Freiburg and the Slovakia national team.

Honours 
Neulengbach
 ÖFB-Frauenliga: 2013–14; runner-up 2014–15
 ÖFB Ladies Cup: runner-up 2013–14, 2014–15

External links 
 
 

1991 births
Living people
Slovak women's footballers
Women's association football defenders
Slovakia women's international footballers
FIFA Century Club
ÖFB-Frauenliga players
Frauen-Bundesliga players
ŠK Slovan Bratislava (women) players
SV Neulengbach (women) players
SC Sand players
SC Freiburg (women) players
Slovak expatriate footballers
Slovak expatriate sportspeople in Austria
Expatriate women's footballers in Austria
Slovak expatriate sportspeople in Germany
Expatriate women's footballers in Germany
Sportspeople from Trnava